This is a complete list of cities in Ukraine. On 1 January 2022, there were 461 cities (misto) in Ukraine. City status is granted by the Verkhovna Rada, the Ukrainian parliament. The city status is only partially related to the size of a populated place in Ukraine.

Smaller settlements are urban-type settlements (comparable to towns in English-speaking countries) and villages (selo).

Historically, there were systems of city rights, granted by the territorial lords, which defined the status of a place as a misto or selo. Cities were self-governing and had several privileges.

The list of cities is ordered by 2021 estimates of population and compared to the 2001 Ukrainian Census, except for Chernobyl for which population is an unofficial estimate. The cities with special status are shown in italic.

Cities in Ukraine

Jump to table of cities

See also

 Geography of Ukraine
 ISO 3166-2:UA
 List of cities in Donetsk Oblast
 List of places named after people (Ukraine)

References

External links
 Regions of Ukraine and their composition 
 2001 Ukrainian census, Population Structure 
 

Cities
 
Ukraine
Demographics of Ukraine